Ghent Historic District may refer to:
(sorted by state, then city/town)

 Ghent Historic District (Ghent, Kentucky), listed on the National Register of Historic Places (NRHP) in Carroll County, Kentucky
 Ghent Historic District (New Bern, North Carolina), listed on the NRHP in Craven County, North Carolina
 Ghent Historic District (Ghent, Ohio), listed on the NRHP in Summit County, Ohio
 Ghent Historic District (Norfolk, Virginia), NRHP-listed